Group A of the WABA League is due to take place between 12 October 2022 and 21 December 2022. The four best ranked teams will advance to the SuperLeague.

24 September 2022 Play Off Sarajevo (Bosnia and Herzegovina) has withdraws from the 2022–23 WABA League. As per the Official Basketball Rules, all games were awarded to their respective opponents with a score of 20-0. Furthermore, the forfeiting team Play Off Sarajevo will receive 0 classification points in the standings.

Standings

Fixtures and results
All times given below are in Central European Time (for the match played in Bulgaria is time expressed in Eastern European Time).

Game 1

Game 2

Game 3

Game 4

Game 5

Game 6

Game 7

Game 8

Game 9

Game 10

References

External links
Official website

Group A